Transtillaspis dromadaria is a species of moth of the family Tortricidae. It is found in Loja Province, Ecuador.

The wingspan is about 16 mm.  The ground colour of the forewings is brownish cream, dotted with brownish and with brownish markings. The hindwings are cream, spotted with brownish grey.

Etymology
The species name refers to the bi-lobed dorsum of the median part of the transtilla and is derived from Latin dromadar (meaning dromadar).

References

Moths described in 2008
Transtillaspis
Taxa named by Józef Razowski